Jules Janet (22 December 1861 – 1945) was a French physician, psychologist and psychotherapist, best known today for his clinical contributions to psychological trauma as the cause of hysteria, a view shared with his brother Pierre.

Notes

External links
 Jules Janet (1861-1945)

1861 births
1945 deaths
Academic staff of the University of Paris
École Normale Supérieure alumni
French psychiatrists
French hypnotists